Mahim Junction ([maːɦiːm]; station code: MM) is a railway station on the Western line and Harbour Line of the Mumbai Suburban Railway network. It serves the last town of the Mumbai city : Mahim.

References

Railway stations in Mumbai City district
Railway junction stations in India
Mumbai Suburban Railway stations
Mumbai WR railway division